Vrhe is a settlement in the Municipality of Trbovlje in central Slovenia. It lies in the hills northwest of the town of Trbovlje and part of the settlement lies in the neighbouring Municipality of Zagorje ob Savi. The area is part of the traditional region of Styria. It is now included with the rest of the municipality in the Central Sava Statistical Region.

Name
The name of the settlement was changed from Sveti Lenart (literally, 'Saint Leonard') to Vrhe (literally, 'peaks') in 1955. The name was changed on the basis of the 1948 Law on Names of Settlements and Designations of Squares, Streets, and Buildings as part of efforts by Slovenia's postwar communist government to remove religious elements from toponyms.

References

External links

Vrhe on Geopedia

Populated places in the Municipality of Trbovlje